Titan Sports may refer to:

 Titan Sports, Inc., former name of World Wrestling Entertainment, Inc.
 Titan Sports (newspaper), Chinese newspaper
 Titan Sports Media Group, sports media group in China